Akisha Albert (February 8, 1995) is a Curaçaoan beauty pageant titleholder who represented Curaçao in Reina Hispanoamericana where she placed as first runner-up. As the winner of the 2018 Miss Universe Curaçao pageant she also represented the island at Miss Universe 2018 finishing in the top 10.

Early life
Akisha Albert is a model currently pursuing a bachelor's degree in English Education at the University of Curaçao. She intends to one day work as a teacher. Akisha speaks four languages and enjoys reading, writing, journaling, and exercising. She hopes to one day publish a motivational book to inspire, encourage and motivate women to be ambitious, follow their dreams, aspire to greatness and unlock their dreams. Akisha is passionate about 'Keep It 100 and Shine', a foundation she founded to recognize and put the positive light on the ones that are less involved in the society, specifically individuals affected with Down syndrome and other disabilities. Through her foundation, Akisha has organized fundraisers and events to spread a message of hope, acceptance, and inclusion. It took Akisha three years of preparation before she finally felt ready to conquer the Miss Curaçao crown and to finally make her dream come true of representing her country Curaçao at the Miss Universe pageant. As she states "preparation meeting the moment of opportunity" and that "a winner is a dreamer who never gives up".

Pageantry

Miss Curaçao Teenager 2012
Akisha joined the Miss Curaçao Teenager pageant in 2012 and won several prizes during the competition.

Miss Curaçao World 2014
Akisha joined the Miss Curaçao World Señorita Curaçao 2014 where she placed as first runner up, earning her the Miss Earth Curaçao title. Other than that she also won the Top Model Of The World Title while competing in the Miss Curaçao World pageant. As such, Akisha represented Curaçao at Miss Earth 2014.

Reina Hispanoamericana 2017
Akisha Albert got picked by the Coridja Stars Productions to represent Curaçao at the Reina Hispanoamericana 2017 in Bolivia where she earned 1st Runner-up place (Virreina) to Miss Philippines, who won.

Miss Universe Curaçao 2018
On September 9, 2018, Akisha was crowned Miss Curaçao 2018 at the World Trade Center, Curaçao. Six contestants vied for the crown. Throughout the pageant, she also earned the titles of Miss Elegance and first runner-up at the Miss Playa (beachwear) competition.

Miss Universe 2018
Akisha Albert represented Curaçao at Miss Universe 2018 and made it into the Top 10, making her the 6th person from Curaçao to place in the pageant: in 1968 Curaçao's Anne Marie Braafheid became 1st runner-up at the Miss Universe pageant, making her the first black woman in the world to attain a similar position at a Grand Slam pageant. Furthermore, the island has placed in 1976 (Top 12), 1991 & 2015 (Top 10), 1997 (Top 6) and 2022 (Top 5).

Fun Fact
Coincidentally, in all the international pageants that Akisha Albert joined, the representatives of the Philippines always won. 
In Miss Earth 2014, the winner was Jamie Herrell from the Philippines. In Reina Hispanoamericana 2017, the winner was Teresita Marquez from the Philippines. Lastly, in Miss Universe 2018, the winner was Catriona Gray, also from the Philippines.

References

External links
Miss Earth Official Website

Living people
Miss Earth 2014 contestants
Miss Universe 2018 contestants
1995 births